Robert L. Marion is a United States Army lieutenant general who serves as the Principal Military Deputy to the Assistant Secretary of the Army for Acquisition, Logistics, and Technology and the Director of the United States Army Acquisition Corps. Previously, he served as the Deputy Commander of the Combined Security Transition Command-Afghanistan.

References

Living people
Place of birth missing (living people)
Recipients of the Defense Superior Service Medal
Recipients of the Legion of Merit
United States Army generals
United States Army personnel of the War in Afghanistan (2001–2021)
Year of birth missing (living people)